Ermenegildo "Gildo" Arena (25 February 1921, Naples – 8 February 2005, Naples) was an Italian water polo player and freestyle swimmer who competed in the 1948 Summer Olympics and in the 1952 Summer Olympics.

In 1948 he was part of the Italian team which won the gold medal. He played six matches and scored eleven goals. Four years later he was a member of the Italian team which won the bronze medal in the Olympic tournament. He played all eight matches.

See also
 Italy men's Olympic water polo team records and statistics
 List of Olympic champions in men's water polo
 List of Olympic medalists in water polo (men)

References

External links
 

1921 births
2005 deaths
Italian male water polo players
Italian male freestyle swimmers
Water polo players at the 1948 Summer Olympics
Water polo players at the 1952 Summer Olympics
Olympic gold medalists for Italy in water polo
Olympic bronze medalists for Italy in water polo
Swimmers from Naples
Medalists at the 1952 Summer Olympics
Medalists at the 1948 Summer Olympics
Water polo players from Naples